The  ( in Attic Greek, or ,  in Doric Greek) was the rigorous education and training program mandated for all male Spartan citizens, with the exception of the firstborn son in the ruling houses, Eurypontid and Agiad. The word  had various meanings in Ancient Greek, and comes from the verb  (to lead). There is no evidence that it was used to refer to the Spartan education system until the 3rd century BC, but it was often used before then to mean training, guidance, or discipline.

The education featured in the  involved cultivating loyalty to Sparta through military training (e.g., pain tolerance), hunting, dancing, singing, and social (communicating) preparation. The  was divided into three age groups, roughly corresponding to young children, adolescents, and young adults.

According to Xenophon, it was introduced by the semi-mythical Spartan law-giver Lycurgus, and modern scholars have dated its inception to the 7th or 6th century BC Regardless, the structure and content of the  changed over time as the practice fell in and out of favour throughout the Hellenistic period.

The Classical Agōgē

Structure
The boys were further subdivided into groups called  (singular , meaning "pack"), with whom they would sleep, and were led by an older boy who Plutarch claims was chosen by the boys themselves.

The  were taught the basics of reading and writing, but even the early stages of education focused on the development of skills that would encourage military prowess. Boys would compete in athletic events such as running and wrestling, as well as choral dance performances. Notably,  were expected to steal food for themselves and for their , and were probably underfed as a means of encouraging this. Stealing did not go unpunished, however, as Xenophon reports that those who were caught would be beaten, a lesson which he claims taught the boys stealth and resourcefulness. Plutarch reports that the boys slept together with the other members of their , constructing beds out of reeds pulled by hand from the Eurotas River.

Additionally,  were educated in Laconism, the art of speaking in brief, witty phrases. According to French historian Jean Ducat, Aristotle believed that it was important that a Spartan learn how to poke fun at his peers, and that he be able to accept the teasing himself.

Plutarch described this form of Spartan pederasty (erotic relationship) as one where older warriors (as the erastes) would engage promising youths (the eromenos) in a long-lasting relationship with an instructive motive. Xenophon, on the other hand, claims that the laws of Lycurgus strictly prohibited sexual relationships with the boys, although he acknowledges that this is unusual compared to other Greek city-states.

Physical training and athletic competitions continued with an increased intensity.

The term  means: "those who have reached physical adulthood". Those  who had impressed their elders the most during their training could be selected for the Crypteia, a type of 'Secret Police' tasked with maintaining control over the Helot population through violence. While scholars such as Pierre Vidal-Naquet have suggested that the Crypteia functioned as an initiatory ritual in the transition into adulthood, others, such as David Dodd, believe it was used primarily as a tool of terror. Plutarch and Plato also differ in their accounts about the Crypteia, with Plutarch mentioning brutal killings done by the Crypteia in Life of Lycurgus and Plato not mentioning the killings at all in Laws

Xenophon describes the selection process as a public event where each of the three  (commanders) chooses 100 men, supposedly to instill a rivalry between each group, seeing as each man would be loyal to the  who chose him and resentful of the other two. He claims that this encouraged the groups to report instances of their rivals' wrongdoing, effectively keeping the entire cohort in check.

Purpose 
The competitive nature of athletic events encouraged hard work and merit. However, it is likely that the  had a second purpose: to instil in young children a collective Spartan identity. The  kept Spartan boys away from their families for much of their childhood, which Stephen Hodkinson believes taught them to favour the needs of the entire populace over that of an individual. Since a Spartan man's formative years were spent entirely in a perpetual competition of merit (both physical and social) they were encouraged to conform to the Spartan laws and social norms. Completion of the  also served to define what it meant to be a Spartan citizen: one who had proven his mastery of both physical strength and social conventions.

After the Classical period 
It was abolished less than forty years later by Philopoemen when Sparta was forced into the Achaean League in 188/9 BCE, but was restored after Sparta came into Roman possession in 146 BCE.

For example, there may have been a change in the way boys were divided by age; Plutarch (writing in the 2nd century CE) mentions only two groups: the younger  and the older . As well, the term  appears to replace the Classical  as the name for the groups of boys.

However, the cult of Artemis Orthia continued to play a role. Cicero describes an initiation ritual where naked boys were brutally whipped at the altar of that goddess, and numerous  mention contests of choral singing and dancing which may celebrate Artemis and the hunt. It is likely around this time that a game called  was developed (although it may have existed in the Classical period), which took place on a small island, and featured a violent, physical contest with the goal of forcing the opposing side into the water. This contest was likely ritual in nature, as two sacrifices were performed before the event could begin. The characterization of the Roman-era  as especially brutal reinforced the opinion of the Roman public that Spartans were traditionally a harsh, warlike people.

Paidonomos 
According to Xenophon, the position is as old as the  itself, having been created by Lycurgus at the same time. Plutarch notes that the  would observe an 's punishment of younger boys in his , in order to assess whether or not it was acceptable.

Reception

In Antiquity 

The historian Xenophon is a notable example of this, as his sons reportedly took part in the  despite being Athenian. It is likely that such  were sponsored and hosted by a Spartan family; Xenophon himself was a friend of King Agesilaus II. This practice likely continued into the Hellenistic Period.

Plutarch, writing after Xenophon and during the Roman era when the Agoge was restored, was critical of this education. He wrote that the reading and writing were studied only for practical reasons and that every other form of education was banned in the city-state.  Plutarch also emphasized the brutality and indoctrination of the Spartan education system.

19th – 21st centuries 
In the early 20th century, comparisons were drawn between the Spartan education system and the Royal Prussian Cadets in Germany, praising the harsh education as the driving force behind the cadets' military prowess.  In 1900, Paul von Szczepanski published his novel  (Spartan Youths) about his education at one such cadet school during the late 19th century. Aside from the name, the book features other references to Spartan training, which Helen Roche believes are indicators that boys at these schools were taught to associate themselves with young Spartans.

In Weimar Germany, after the loss of the First World War, many scholars drew connections with the sacrifice of the Spartan king Leonidas at Thermopylae in order to justify the deaths of those who died in the war. In the 1930s, the Nazi-aligned professor Helmut Berve praised the Spartan style of education in particular for its ability to weed out those considered "unfit" for society, and to create a community of unified warriors. He argued that Nazi leaders should use Sparta as an example of their ideal society, ideas which Hitler himself supposedly agreed with. At the Adolf Hitler Schule in Weimar, Germany, schoolchildren were taught that Sparta maintained its power by producing tough, -educated warriors.

Spartan Race Inc., an American company, hosts a variety of endurance competitions across the world, the most challenging of which is called "". It stands as a physical trial rather than as state sponsored education. In science fiction, Red Rising contains a training program based on Greek institution like the agōgē in the form of a state sponsored military education system which utilizes Greek names and symbols; the program emphasizes Spartan discipline against Athenian Democracy.

In the American action film 300 (2007), Leonidas is depicted attending the Agoge as a child and fulfilling various physical and mental trials from fighting other children to being whipped as a form of discipline.

Historian Bret Devereaux has compared the Spartan  to the indoctrination of child soldiers in modern societies as part of his blog "A Collection of Unmitigated Pedantry".

See also
History of Sparta
Paideia
Spartiates

References

Bibliography

Secondary sources 

 Cartledge, Paul (2001). Spartan reflections. London: Duckworth. . OCLC 45648270
 Christesen, Paul (2017). Sparta and Athletics. In A Companion to Sparta, ed. Anton Powell. John Wiley & Sons, Ltd. pp.534-564 
 Demandt, Alexander (2002). "Klassik als Klischee: Hitler und die Antike". Historische Zeitschrift. 274 (2): 281–313. ISSN 0018-2613.
 Devereaux, Bret (2019-08-16). "Collections: This. Isn't. Sparta. Part I: Spartan School". A Collection of Unmitigated Pedantry. Retrieved 2021-03-19.
 Dodd, David (2013). Adolescent Initiation in Myth and Tragedy: Rethinking the Black Hunter. In Initiation in Ancient Greek Rituals and Narratives: New Critical Perspectives. Routledge. pp. 71–84. .
 Ducat, Jean (2006). Spartan education : youth and society in the classical period. Emma Stafford, Pamela-Jane Shaw, Anton Powell. Swansea: Classical Press of Wales. . OCLC 76892341
 Figueira, Thomas (2017). Helotage and the Spartan Economy. In A Companion to Sparta, ed. Anton Powell. John Wiley & Sons, Ltd. pp. 565-595. 
 Hodkinson, Stephen (1996). "Agoge". In Hornblower, Simon (ed.). Oxford Classical Dictionary. Oxford University Press.
 Hodkinson, Stephen (2003). Social Order and the Conflict of Values in Classical Sparta. In Sparta, ed. Michael Whitby. Taylor & Francis. pp.104-130. 
 Kennell, Nigel (2017). Spartan Cultural Memory in the Roman Period. In A Companion to Sparta, ed. Anton Powell. John Wiley & Sons, Ltd. pp.643-662. 
 Kennell, Nigel M. (1995). The gymnasium of virtue : education & culture in ancient Sparta. Chapel Hill: University of North Carolina Press. . OCLC 42854632.
 Powell, Anton (2017). Sparta: Reconstructing History from Secrecy, Lies and Myth. In A Companion to Sparta, ed. Anton Powell. pp. 1-28. 
 Rebenich, Stefan (2017). Reception of Sparta in Germany and German-Speaking Europe. In A Companion to Sparta, ed. Anton Powell. John Wiley and Sons, Ltd. pp. 685-703 
 Richer, Nicolas (2017). Spartan Education in the Classical Period. In A Companion to Sparta, eds. Anton Powell. John Wiley & Sons, Ltd. pp. 525-542. 
 Roche, Helen (2013). Sparta's German children the ideal of ancient Sparta in the Royal Prussian Cadet-Corps, 1818-1920, and in the Nationalist-Socialist elite schools (the Napolas), 1933-1945. Swansea: Classical Press of Wales. pp. 32–35. . OCLC 1019630468.
 Scanlon, Thomas Francis (2002). Eros & Greek athletics. New York: Oxford University Press. . OCLC 316719681.
 Stewart, Daniel (2017). From Leuktra to Nabis, 371-192. In A Companion to Sparta, ed. Anton Powell. John Wiley & Sons, Ltd. pp.374-402. 
 Tazelaar, C.M. (1967). "ΠAIΔEΣ KAI EΦHBOI". Mnemosyne. 20 (2): 127–153. doi:10.1163/156852567X01473. ISSN 0026-7074.
 Vidal-Naquet, Pierre (1981). Le chasseur noir : formes de penseé et formes de société dans le monde grec. Paris: F. Maspero. . OCLC 7658419.

Primary sources 

 Aristotle. Politics
 Berve, Helmut (1937). Sparta. Meyers Kleine Handbücher,7. Leipzig: Bibliographisches Institut AG.
 Cicero. Tusculan Disputations
 Plutarch. Lives. Life of Lycurgus
 Plutarch. Lives. Life of Pyrrhus
 Szczepanski, Paul Von (2018). Spartanerjünglinge: Eine Kadettengeschichte in Briefen. Forgotten Books. .
 Xenophon. Constitution of the Lacedaimonians

Education in ancient Greece
Spartan military training